Mount Oupay in Cameroon is the highest point in the Mandara Mountains, with an elevation of 1,494 m (4,902 ft).

External links
Hoséré Oupay: Cameroon at Geographical Names

Oupay
Far North Region (Cameroon)